In Greek mythology, the name Chalcodon (Ancient Greek: Χαλκώδων, gen.: Χαλκώδοντος means "copper tooth" or "iron tooth", from χαλκός=copper and generally metal + ὀδών, ionic type of ὀδούς=tooth)  may refer to:

Chalcodon, an Egyptian prince as one of the sons of King Aegyptus. He suffered the same fate as his other brothers, save Lynceus, when they were slain on their wedding night by their wives who obeyed the command of their father King Danaus of Libya. Chalcodon was the son of Aegyptus by an Arabian woman and thus full brother of Istrus, Agenor, Chaetus,  Diocorystes, Alces, Alcmenor, Hippothous, Euchenor and Hippolytus. In some accounts, he could be a son of Aegyptus either by Eurryroe, daughter of the river-god Nilus, or Isaie, daughter of King Agenor of Tyre. Chalcodon married the Danaid Rhodia, daughter of Danaus either by the hamadryads Atlanteia or Phoebe.
Chalcodon, the son of Abas and the king of the Abantes. He and Telamon assisted Heracles in his campaign against Elis. While leading his people in an attack on Thebes, Greece he was killed by Amphitryon. His son was Elephenor by either Imenarete, Melanippe or Alcyone. He also had several daughters, one of whom, Chalciope, married Aegeas.
Chalcodon of Cos, who wounded Heracles in a battle which arose when the Coans mistook Heracles for a pirate. Also known as Chalcon.
Chalcodon, a suitor of Hippodamia before Pelops, was killed by Oenomaus.

See also

Chalcon

Notes

References 

 Apollodorus, The Library with an English Translation by Sir James George Frazer, F.B.A., F.R.S. in 2 Volumes, Cambridge, MA, Harvard University Press; London, William Heinemann Ltd. 1921. ISBN 0-674-99135-4. Online version at the Perseus Digital Library. Greek text available from the same website.
Athenaeus of Naucratis, The Deipnosophists or Banquet of the Learned. London. Henry G. Bohn, York Street, Covent Garden. 1854. Online version at the Perseus Digital Library.
 Athenaeus of Naucratis, Deipnosophistae. Kaibel. In Aedibus B.G. Teubneri. Lipsiae. 1887. Greek text available at the Perseus Digital Library.
 Pausanias, Description of Greece with an English Translation by W.H.S. Jones, Litt.D., and H.A. Ormerod, M.A., in 4 Volumes. Cambridge, MA, Harvard University Press; London, William Heinemann Ltd. 1918. . Online version at the Perseus Digital Library
Pausanias, Graeciae Descriptio. 3 vols. Leipzig, Teubner. 1903.  Greek text available at the Perseus Digital Library.
Theocritus, Idylls from The Greek Bucolic Poets translated by Edmonds, J M. Loeb Classical Library Volume 28. Cambridge, MA. Harvard University Press. 1912. Online version at theoi.com
 Theocritus, Idylls edited by R. J. Cholmeley, M.A. London. George Bell & Sons. 1901. Greek text available at the Perseus Digital Library.
Tzetzes, John, Book of Histories, Book VII-VIII translated by Vasiliki Dogani from the original Greek of T. Kiessling's edition of 1826. Online version at theio.com

Kings in Greek mythology
Princes in Greek mythology
Sons of Aegyptus
Egyptian characters in Greek mythology
Euboean characters in Greek mythology